Dichomeris cachrydias is a moth in the family Gelechiidae. It was described by Edward Meyrick in 1914. It is found in Guyana and Brazil.

The forewings are dark fuscous, each more or less surrounded with fuscous suffusion coalescing with a broad streak of fuscous suffusion extending above the fold to the tornus. There is an undefined patch of fuscous suffusion towards the costa about three-fourths, and a streak along the termen. The hindwings are grey.

References

Moths described in 1914
cachrydias